Percy Alexander Hulley (born 23 February 1941) is a South African zoologist and ichthyologist.. He is a research associate at the South African Museum and has described many species of fish including the taillight shark.

Biography 
Hulley completed his MSc in 1967 from the University of Cape Town with a thesis entitled: Studies on the anatomy of some South African Mytilidae (Bivalvia) with notes on their ecology and distribution. He submitted his PhD thesis in 1971 entitled: The origin, interrelationship and distribution of Southern African Rajidae (Chondrichthyes, Batoidei)

He has worked at the South African Museum since 1965, where he was deputy director (research) and curator of fishes at the South African Museum until 2005. From 2006, Hulley has worked at the South African Museum in an honorary capacity as a research associate.

The comprehensive Mesopelagic Fish Collection of the South African museum was assembled primarily by Hulley. The collection contains fish that live between 200m and 1 000m below the surface. Mesopelagic fish constitutes 95% of the world’s fish biomass.

Selected publications 
Hulley has authored or co-authored more than 100 articles, reports and chapters for academic works, including:

Taxa named in his honor 
Hulley is honoured in the naming of a legskate and other fishes:
 Eustomias hulleyi - Goman & Gibbs 1985
 Antigonia hulleyi - Parin & Borodulina 2005
 Argyripnus hulleyi -  Quéro, Spitz & Vayne, 2009
 Roughnose Legskate Cruriraja hulleyi - Aschliman, Ebert & Compagno 2010
 Diogenichthys hulleyi - Schwarzhans 2013

Taxa described by him
Hulley discovered and named several other sharks and fish, amongst others:
 Taillight Shark genus Euprotomicroides - Hulley 1966
 Bottleneck Skate genus Rostroraja  - Hulley 1972
 Taillight Shark Euprotomicroides zantesdeschia - Hulley & Penrith 1966
 Roberts Bigmouth Skate Amblyraja robertsi - Hulley 1970
 Yellow-spotted Skate Leucoraja wallacei - Hulley 1970
 Ghost Skate Rajella dissimilis - Hulley 1970
 Smoothback Skate Rajella ravidula - Hulley 1972
 African Pygmy Skate Neoraja stehmanni - Hulley 1972
 Lanternfish genus Krefftichthys - Hulley 1981
 False-Midas lanternfish Gymnoscopelus hintonoides - Hulley 1981
 Minispotted lanternfish Gymnoscopelus microlampas - Hulley 1981
 Nacreous lanternfish Lampanyctus vadulus - Hulley 1981
 Herwig lanternfish Metelectrona herwigi - Hulley 1981
 Gaptooth lanternfish Protomyctophum choriodon - Hulley 1981
 Jewelled lanternfish Protomyctophum gemmatum - Hulley 1981
 Damsel lanternfish Protomyctophum luciferum - Hulley 1981
 Krefft's lanternfish Symbolophorus kreffti - Hulley 1981
 Astronesthes illuminatus - Parin, Borodulina & Hulley 1999
 Astronesthes galapagensis - Parin, Borodulina & Hulley 1999
See :Category:Taxa named by P. Alexander Hulley

References

External references 

Publications by P. Alexander Hulley on Semantic Scholar

South African zoologists
South African ichthyologists
Living people
1941 births
University of Cape Town alumni